Albert G. Jackes (1844 – February 8, 1888) was an early Canadian politician and medical doctor. Jackes served on the short lived Council of Keewatin.

Early life
Jackes was born in Yorkville, Upper Canada in 1844, the son of Franklin Jackes and his wife, Catherine. He grew up in Ontario and went to the University of Toronto. He graduated from the University of Toronto with honors in 1864. After university he moved to New York City to begin apprenticing in a medical practice with Dr. Louis Bauer. A couple years later he moved west to St. Louis to begin practicing medicine on his own. His health began to fail and he returned to Canada.

Jackes began his rise to fame after he received his first medical appointment by Lieutenant Governor William McDougall. He traveled with McDougall in the Northwest Territories shortly after the territory was created.

From 1871 until 1873 Jackes ran a medical practice in Portage la Prairie. He moved to Winnipeg and continued practicing until 1877.

Political career
Jackes was appointed to serve on the Council of Keewatin, the short lived government for the District of Keewatin territory on November 25, 1876. His persistent health issues flared up and he was the only member of the council to miss the throne speech by Alexander Morris on November 30, 1876  Jackes submitted his resignation with the rest of the council on April 16, 1877.

Late life
He married his wife Mary Jane Blair February 6, 1882 in Toronto. He died on February 8, 1888, from a case of bronchitis that developed from a cold he caught on New Year's Eve.

References 

1844 births
1888 deaths
District of Keewatin councillors
Physicians from Manitoba
University of Toronto alumni